
Gmina Stare Pole is a rural gmina (administrative district) in Malbork County, Pomeranian Voivodeship, in northern Poland.

Villages
Gmina Stare Pole contains the villages and settlements of Janówka, Janowo, Kaczynos, Kaczynos-Kolonia, Kikojty, Kławki, Klecie, Krasnołęka, Kraszewo, Królewo, Królewo Malborskie, Krzyżanowo, Leklowy, Letniki, Parwark, Stare Pole, Szaleniec, Szlagnowo, Ząbrowo, Zarzecze and Złotowo.

Neighbouring gminas
Gmina Stare Pole is bordered by the gminas of Dzierzgoń, Gronowo Elbląskie, Malbork, Markusy, Nowy Staw and Stary Targ.

References
Polish official population figures 2006

Stare Pole
Malbork County